Lori Ann Mountford (born July 31, 1959) is an American curler. Born in Portage, Wisconsin, she graduated from Poynette High School and started curling at age 20 at Madison Curling Club. Mountford is a two-time Olympian, competing the 1988 Winter Olympics when curling was first re-introduced as an exhibition sport and then again at the 1998 Winter Olympics when curling was a full event. Her team, skipped by Lisa Schoeneberg, placed 5th both times.

Mountford was inducted into the United States Curling Association Hall of Fame in 2016.

Teams

References

External links 

1959 births
Living people
American female curlers
Curlers at the 1988 Winter Olympics
Curlers at the 1998 Winter Olympics
Olympic curlers of the United States
Sportspeople from Madison, Wisconsin
American curling champions
People from Portage, Wisconsin
21st-century American women